Brick House is an EP by Canadian rapper Saukrates, released February 5, 1997 in the United States. It was released independently on Serious Entertainment and Capitol Hill Music. The EP was popular among underground hip hop fans, with 20,000 copies sold. It features appearances by American rappers Common, Masta Ace, and O.C. It also includes "Father Time" which was released as a 12" single in 1995.

Track listing

12" EP
A-side

B-side

References

1997 debut EPs
Albums produced by No I.D.
Albums produced by Saukrates
Hip hop EPs
Saukrates albums